Norbert "Nobbi" Christian Schmitz (27 December 1958 – 6 April 1998) was a German footballer who made a total of 89 2. Bundesliga appearances for Tennis Borussia Berlin and SC Fortuna Köln during his professional career.

Schmitz died of cancer at the age of 39.

References 
 

1958 births
1998 deaths
People from Düren
Sportspeople from Cologne (region)
Deaths from cancer in Germany
German footballers
Association football midfielders
2. Bundesliga players
1. FC Köln players
1. FC Köln II players
Tennis Borussia Berlin players
SC Fortuna Köln players
Footballers from North Rhine-Westphalia